is a Japanese television drama that premiered on TV Asahi on January 10, 2005. It ran for 12 episodes until its conclusion on March 10, 2005. Set in a virtual simulation of Shibuya, Tokyo which is regulated by an entity named Piece which does not allow inhabitants to live, the series focuses on a fifteen-year-old boy named Tsuyoshi who seeks to find both his lost memories and a way to escape Shibuya. To maintain control, Piece "kills" those who do not operate within the proper confines of the world, which results in their being reset and inserted back into the city with a new name and identity and without their previous memories.

The episodes are directed by Nobuhiro Suzuki and Ryuta Tasaki, using scripts written by Shoji Yonemura. Their soundtrack was composed by Kuniaki Haishima. A single volume manga adaptation, written and illustrated by Go Yabuki, was released by Kadokawa Shoten on July 1, 2005.

Cast

Saya Yūki as Tsuyoshi
Yui Aragaki as Ema
Yuria Haga as Asagi
Toru Yamashita as Ryuugo
Uehara Takuya as DJ
Mao Kato as Mikio
Tomohisa Yuge as Kengo
Mitsuru Karahashi as Ootomo
Mark Musashi as Piece 
Risa Ai as Haru
Takashi Matsuyama as Igaya

Episode list

References

External links
 Official TV Asahi  website 
 
 

2005 Japanese television series debuts
2005 Japanese television series endings
Japanese drama television series
TV Asahi original programming